David Douglas Wagener (October 11, 1792 – October 1, 1860) was a member of the U.S. House of Representatives from Pennsylvania.

Biography
Wagener was born in Easton, Pennsylvania on October 11, 1972. He was captain of the Easton Union Guards from 1816 to 1829.

Wagener was elected as a Jacksonian to the Twenty-third and Twenty-fourth Congresses and elected as a Democrat to the Twenty-fifth and Twenty-sixth Congresses. He served as the chairman of the United States House Committee on Militia during the Twenty-fifth Congress.

In 1852, he established the Easton Bank in 1852, and was its president until his death in Easton in 1860. He was interred in the Easton Cemetery.

References

Politicians from Easton, Pennsylvania
American bankers
1792 births
1860 deaths
Jacksonian members of the United States House of Representatives from Pennsylvania
19th-century American politicians
Democratic Party members of the United States House of Representatives from Pennsylvania